Alexander Boyd (September 14, 1764 – April 8, 1857) was an American politician and a U.S. Representative from New York.

Biography
Boyd was born in Albany in the Province of New York. He married Elizabeth Becker and they had thirteen children, Delia, John, Helen, David, Ann, Albert Barthalomew, Peter, James, Margaret, William, Nancy, Alexander, and Hugh.

Career
Boyd moved to Middleburgh, Schoharie County, New York and engaged in agricultural pursuits.

Elected as a Federalist to the 13th United States Congress, Boyd was United States Representative for the thirteenth district of New York from March 4, 1813, to March 3, 1815.

Death
Boyd died in Esperance, Schoharie County, New York, on April 8, 1857 (age 92 years, 206 days). He is interred at Schoharie Cemetery, Schoharie, New York.

References

External links

The Political Graveyard
Govtrack US Congress

1764 births
1857 deaths
Politicians from Albany, New York
People from Middleburgh, New York
Federalist Party members of the United States House of Representatives from New York (state)